Originally produced by Minolta, and after the Minolta/Sony merger produced by Sony, the 24-105mm 3.5-4.5 (D) was compatible with cameras using the Minolta AF and Sony α lens mounts.

See also
List of Minolta A-mount lenses

Sources
 Dyxum lens data
 Dyxum Sony variant lens data

External links
Sony:  SAL-24105: 24-105mm F3.5-4.5 lens

24-105
Camera lenses introduced in 2001